Kiribati and Spain have had bilateral diplomatic relations since 2011. The embassy of Spain in Wellington, New Zealand, is accredited for Kiribati.

Historical relations 
The islands were conquered by Spanish ships in the early 16th century. Between 1528 - 1707; 1875 - 1885 the islands were conquered by the ships commanded by two Portuguese and one Spaniard: Fernando de Magallanes, Pedro Fernández de Quirós and Álvaro de Saavedra Cerón and (the Spanish domain was from 1528 - 1885).

Gilbert Islands 
One of the first recorded "discoveries" of the islands by Europeans was in 1528, when Captain Saavedra discovered the island of Tarawa. In 1686, when Francisco de Lezcano arrived on the island Yap and named that archipelago as the Caroline Islands, in honor of King Carlos II of Spain, he extended that name to the islands Palau and those that were later renamed Gilbert Islands and Marshall Islands.

Phoenix Islands 
The Phoenix Islands or Rawaki Islands are a set of sparsely populated atolls located in the Pacific Ocean, east of the Gilbert Islands, west of the Line Islands and north of Samoa. They were discovered and conquered by Magellan in 1520 and remained under Spanish rule until 1899, when by the Treaty of Paris they passed to the United States.

Line Islands 
Archaeological remains indicate that some of the Line Islands were inhabited by Polynesians, but when the Europeans arrived they were already uninhabited.  They were incorporated into the British colony of the Gilbert and Ellice Islands in 1916.

Diplomatic relations 
Spain has had diplomatic relations with Kiribati since 2011 and the Embassy in Wellington, officially opened in June 2009, is accredited in Kiribati. As a member of the states of Africa, the Caribbean and the Pacific (ACP), Kiribati acceded in 2005 to Cotonou Agreement and receives assistance from EU with the objective of reducing, and in the long term, eradicate poverty and assist in the development of the country.

The remote geography and the lack of historical ties explain the very low level of bilateral relations between the two countries, which are mainly channeled through the EU institutions, including development aid.

Economic relations 
Kiribati ratified in 2009 the Agreement on Trade between Countries of the Pacific Islands (PICTA), which includes another 10 countries, of the 14 members of the Pacific Islands Forum, which it signed for the first time in 2001. It is a Free trade agreement for goods and services. PICTA negotiates with the EU a comprehensive regional economic partnership agreement AAE, under which, exports destined for the EU, would be duty-free.

In September 2012 the Fisheries Association Agreement between Kiribati and the European Union was signed. It has a duration of six years, is renewable and includes fishing vessels from Spain, France and Portugal. The economic relations between Kiribati and Spain are very small; in the period 2008/2012 Spain exported only €51,000 and imported €27,000.

Cooperation 
Kiribati is a signatory to the Treaty of Cotonou, through which he receives help from the European Union. The Country Strategy Document for Kiribati (2008-2013) established the strategic framework for cooperation between the European Union and Kiribati within the 10th European Development Fund. The total allocation for Kiribati was €20 million. The assistance focused on the sector of drinking water, sanitation and renewable energy projects (for example, photovoltaic solar technology).

Recent projects between the EU and Kiribati have included improvement in telecommunications, the development of seaweed cultivation for export, solar energy systems for the farthest islands, the increase of control tower services and the fight against fire at Tarawa Bonriki International Airport, medical services and assistance for the Kiribati vocational training program.

These funds will be allocated to the development of tuna fishing and the possibility of a processing plant, improved navigation between islands and tourism development.

See also 
 Foreign relations of Kiribati
 Foreign relations of Spain

References 

 
Spain
Kiribati